On Trial (French: L'Affaire Maurizius; Italian: Il caso Mauritius) is a 1954 French-Italian crime drama film directed by Julien Duvivier and starring Daniel Gélin, Madeleine Robinson and Anton Walbrook. It was based on a 1928 novel by Jakob Wassermann.

Synopsis 
Etzel, the son of the great prosecutor Andergast, wants to look over the file for the Maurizius case, in which the accused was condemned on the basis of suppositions. This was the case which allowed his father, 18 years earlier, to get a head start in his career, but Etzel has some doubts.

Cast
 Daniel Gélin : Léonard Maurizius
 Madeleine Robinson : Elisabeth Maurizius
 Anton Walbrook: Grégoire Waremme
 Charles Vanel : Wolf Andergast
 Eleonora Rossi Drago : Anna Jahn
 Bernard Musson : le greffier
 Jean d'Yd : le président
 Jacques Varennes : le juge d'instruction
 Claude Arlay
 Pierre Asso : Le maître-chanteur 
 Paola Borboni : Mme Bobika 
 Berthe Bovy : La grand-mère 
 Jacques Chabassol : Etzel 
 Denis d'Inès : M. Maurizius 
 Jane Faber : La gouvernante 
 Annie Fargue 
 Jim Gérald : Le professeur 
 Harry-Max : L'avocat 
 Daniel Mendaille 
 Pierre Palau : Le conseiller
 Joseph Palau-Fabre 
 Sandro Ruffini 
 Aldo Silvani 
 Claude Sylvain : Mélita

References

External links

1954 films
French drama films
Italian drama films
1950s French-language films
Films directed by Julien Duvivier
Films based on German novels
Films about miscarriage of justice
Films set in Germany
1954 drama films
Italian black-and-white films
French black-and-white films
1950s French films
1950s Italian films